

The CAP-1 Planalto was a military trainer aircraft built in Brazil during World War II. It was a low-wing cantilever monoplane with fixed tailwheel undercarriage that accommodated the pilot and instructor in tandem open cockpits. The project had been initiated by Instituto de Pesquisas Tecnológicas (IPT) under the designation IPT-4 and although the design work had been contracted to CAP, IPT insisted on a wing profile of its own choosing that led to serious stability problems in the final product.

The CAP-3 replaced the CAP-1's Franklin 4AC engine with a de Havilland Gipsy with double its power, but the stability problems remained unaddressed until CAP engineer Oswaldo Fadigas redesigned the wing in the CAP-6. The firm attempted to sell this latter type to the Ministry of Aeronautics, but succeeded only in selling conversion kits for the existing CAP-1s and -3s in the military's inventory.

Specifications

References

External links
 Aeroclube de Joinville website

Low-wing aircraft
Planalto
Single-engined tractor aircraft
1940s Brazilian military trainer aircraft
Aircraft first flown in 1942